was a Japanese samurai and nobleman. He was one of the most influential samurai in Japanese history and one of the three great nobles who led the Meiji Restoration. Living during the late Edo and early Meiji periods, he later led the Satsuma Rebellion against the Meiji government. Historian Ivan Morris described him as "the quintessential hero of modern Japanese history".

Early life

Saigō Kokichi (西郷 小吉) was born in Kajiya, Kagoshima, Satsuma Domain, the eldest son of samurai squire (koshōkumi) Saigō Kichibē and his wife Masa. He had six siblings and his younger brother was Marshal-Admiral Marquis Saigō Jūdō. His childhood name was Kokichi and he received the given name Takamori in adulthood. He wrote poetry under the name Saigō Nanshū (西郷 南洲).

Shogun Tokugawa Yoshinobu resigned, returning power to the Emperor in what came to be known as the Meiji Restoration. However, Saigō was one of the most vocal and vehement opponents to the negotiated solution, demanding that the Tokugawa be stripped of their lands and special status. His intransigence was one of the major causes of the subsequent Boshin War.

During the Boshin War, Saigō led the imperial forces at the Battle of Toba–Fushimi, and after led the imperial army toward Edo, where he accepted the surrender of Edo Castle from Katsu Kaishū.

Meiji bureaucrat

Although Ōkubo Toshimichi and others were more active and influential in establishing the new Meiji government, Saigō retained a key role, and his cooperation was essential in the abolition of the han system and the establishment of a conscript army. In 1871 he was left in charge of the caretaker government during the absence of the Iwakura Mission (1871–73).

Saigō initially disagreed with the modernization of Japan and the opening of commerce with the West. He famously opposed the construction of a railway network, insisting that money should rather be spent on military modernization.

Saigō did insist, however, that Japan should go to war with Korea in the Seikanron debate of 1873 due to Korea's refusal to recognize the legitimacy of the Emperor Meiji as head of state of the Empire of Japan, and insulting treatment meted out to Japanese envoys attempting to establish trade and diplomatic relations. At one point, he offered to visit Korea in person and to provoke a casus belli by behaving in such an insulting manner that the Koreans would be forced to kill him. However, the other Japanese leaders strongly opposed these plans, partly from budgetary considerations, and partly from realization of the weakness of Japan compared with the western countries from what they had witnessed during the Iwakura Mission. Saigō resigned from all of his government positions in protest and returned to his hometown of Kagoshima.

Satsuma Rebellion (1877)

Shortly thereafter, a private military academy known as the Shi-gakkō was established in Kagoshima for the faithful samurai who had also resigned their posts to follow him from Tokyo. These disaffected samurai came to dominate the Kagoshima government, and fearing a rebellion, the government sent warships to Kagoshima to remove weapons from the Kagoshima arsenal. This provoked open conflict, although with the elimination of samurai rice stipends in 1877, tensions were already extremely high. Although greatly dismayed by the revolt, Saigō was reluctantly persuaded to lead the rebels against the central government.

The rebels fought two significant battles against the central government: the Siege of Kumamoto Castle and the Battle of Tabaruzaka. Saigō was initially confident of his ability to take Kumamoto Castle, but he had underestimated the effectiveness of the imperial conscripts defending the castle. After a failed assault, Saigō settled for a siege. Imperial reinforcements eventually forced their way through the rebel lines at the Battle of Tabaruzaka, lifting the siege. The remnants of Saigō's army retreated before the advancing imperials, who whittled it down relentlessly. Eventually Saigō and his final remaining samurai were encircled and annihilated at the Battle of Shiroyama. 

Saigō's death brought the Satsuma Rebellion to an end.

Death

During the battle of Shiroyama, Saigō was badly injured in the hip. However, the exact manner of his death is unknown. There are no published reports by eyewitnesses. The accounts of his subordinates claim that he stood up and committed seppuku after his injury or that he requested that his friend Beppu Shinsuke assist his suicide. Three firsthand accounts of the condition of his deceased body exist. It is said that he was shot in the femur, then he thrust a sword into his stomach region, then had his head decapitated deliberately by a fellow citizen. All three accounts report that the body was decapitated. Two describe a bullet wound to the hip or thigh. As none of the eyewitness accounts mention a wound to the abdomen, or any fresh sword wound at all, it is unknown if Saigō pierced his stomach with his sword. In debate, some scholars have suggested that neither is the case and that Saigō may have gone into shock following his wound, losing his ability to speak. Several samurai, upon seeing him in this state, would have severed his head, assisting him in the warrior's suicide that they knew he would have wished. Later, they would have said that he committed seppuku to preserve his status as a true samurai.

It is not clear what was done with Saigō's head immediately after his death. Some legends say Saigō's manservant hid the head, and it was later found by a government soldier. The head was somehow retrieved by government forces and was reunited with Saigō's body, which was laid next to that of his deputies Kirino and Murata. This was witnessed by the American sea captain John Capen Hubbard. A myth persists that the head was never found.

Legends

Multiple legends sprang up concerning Saigō, many of which denied his death. It was believed by some that he had fled to Russia, or ascended to Mars. It was even recorded that his image appeared in a comet near the close of the 19th century, an ill omen to his enemies. Unable to overcome the affection that the people had for this paragon of traditional samurai virtues, the Meiji-era government pardoned him posthumously on February 22, 1889. The Japanese people appreciated the fact that he remained loyal to his virtues until his death in 1877.

Artworks depicting Saigō

A famous bronze statue of Saigō in hunting attire with his dog stands in Ueno Park, Tokyo. Made by Takamura Kōun, it was unveiled on December 18, 1898. Saigō met the noted British diplomat Ernest Satow in the 1860s, as recorded in the latter's A Diplomat in Japan, and Satow was present at the unveiling as recorded in his diary.

A reproduction of the same statue stands on Okinoerabujima, where Saigō had been exiled.

A Japanese hand fan commemorating the event, which survives in the collection of the Staten Island Historical Society in New York, features a depiction of Saigō Takamori in a scene labeled (in English) "The Battle Near the Citadel of Kumamoto".

Family

Ancestry

Wives and children
 Ijūin Suga
 Aikana
 Saigō Kikujirō (son): Mayor of Kyoto City, studied politics at Johns Hopkins University
 Saigō Kikusō (daughter)
 Saigō Itoko
 Marquess Saigō Toratarō (son): Colonel in the army, studied at Prussian Military Academy
 Saigō Umajirō (son)
 Saigō Torizō (son)

Siblings
 Marshal-Admiral Marquess Saigō Jūdō (younger brother): Navy Minister
 Saigō Kichijirō (younger brother): Killed in action in the Boshin War
 Saigō Kohei (younger brother): Killed in action in the Satsuma Rebellion
 Ichiki Koto (younger sister)
 Saigō Taka (younger sister)
 Saigō Yasu (younger sister)

See also
 Seikanron

Notes

References
 Hagiwara, Kōichi (2004).  (Illustrated life of Saigō Takamori and Ōkubo Toshimichi) Kawade Shobō Shinsha, 2004  (Japanese)
 Jansen, Marius B. and Gilbert Rozman, eds. (1986). Japan in Transition: from Tokugawa to Meiji. Princeton: Princeton University Press. ; OCLC 12311985
 Jansen, Marius (2000). The Making of Modern Japan. Cambridge: Harvard University Press. ; OCLC 44090600
 Ravina, Mark. (2004). The Last Samurai: The Life and Battles of Saigo Takamori. Hoboken, New Jersey: Wiley. ; OCLC 427566169
Yates, Charles (1995) "Saigo Takamori: The Man Behind The Myth" (New York, NY: Kegan Paul International ) 
Ravina, Mark J. "The Apocryphal Suicide of Saigō Takamori: Samurai, Seppuku, and the Politics of Legend" Journal of Asian Studies 69.3 (2010): 691-721.

External links

Saigo, Takamori | Portraits of Modern Japanese Historical Figures (National Diet Library)

1828 births
1877 deaths
People from Kagoshima
Japanese swordfighters
Samurai
Japanese military leaders
Boshin War
Japanese rebels
Japanese revolutionaries
Meiji Restoration
Nobles of the Meiji Restoration
People from Satsuma Domain
Seppuku from Meiji period to present
Japanese politicians
People of Meiji-period Japan
Shimazu retainers
People of the Boshin War
Japanese folklore
Suicides by sharp instrument in Japan
People killed in the Satsuma Rebellion
Deified Japanese people
1870s suicides